Oregon Ballot Measure 9 was a 1992 citizens' initiative concerning LGBT rights in the state of Oregon. It sought to amend the Oregon Constitution to prohibit anti-discrimination laws regarding sexual orientation and to declare homosexuality to be "abnormal, wrong, unnatural, and perverse".
Listing homosexuality alongside pedophilia and sadism and masochism, it has been described as one of the harshest anti-gay measures presented to voters in American history.

The initiative was an effort of the Oregon Citizens Alliance (OCA), a conservative group active in Oregon politics in the 1990s.
It was defeated in the 1992 general election, receiving 44 percent of the vote. 
The OCA went on to successfully sponsor similar initiatives in several Oregon counties where a majority of voters had supported Measure 9. The Oregon Legislative Assembly eventually overruled these local measures. Opposition to Measure 9 formed the basis of much of the gay rights movement in Oregon.

Political context 
The ballot measure was an effort of the Oregon Citizens Alliance (OCA), a conservative group affiliated with the Christian Coalition that was active in Oregon politics in the 1990s.
In 1991, OCA Chairman Lon Mabon announced an "Abnormal Behaviors Initiative" that would seek to prevent state and local governments from "condoning or promoting" homosexuality along with necrophilia, bestiality, or pedophilia.
Supporters of the eventual ballot measure felt that their traditional values were under siege in the face of growing acceptance of homosexuality by society. Opponents stated that the measure was unfairly discriminatory, that it was unconstitutional, and that it demonstrated the homophobia and bigotry of its backers.

The campaign for Measure 9 occurred in the midst of national discourse around "family values" and an economic downturn in which incumbent president George H. W. Bush sought to appeal to socially conservative voters. At the 1992 Republican National Convention, conservative commentator Pat Buchanan gave a speech saying, "There is a religious war going on in this country. It is a cultural war [...] this is a war for the soul of America".
Bush stated his opposition to anti-discrimination laws protecting sexual orientation, while his opponent Bill Clinton expressed support for LGBT rights. In response to a question at a campaign event in Portland, Oregon, Clinton defended homosexuals' right to "live their lives and make a contribution to the rest of us".

The OCA used the slogan No Special Rights to imply that LGBT people wanted social advantages ("special rights") rather than mere equality. In this and similar campaigns, homosexuality was portrayed as a choice rather than an innate characteristic, one that did not deserve protection.
The campaign also made extensive use of a video titled The Gay Agenda produced by a California evangelical group, featuring scenes from gay pride parades chosen to portray gay men as hypermasculine and threatening.
Another film titled Gay RightsSpecial Rights: Inside the Homosexual Agenda (1993), produced by the Southern Baptist Convention, also circulated in the state.

Reception 
Republican Senator and evangelical Christian Mark Hatfield opposed the measure, as did Oregon's most prominent newspapers. Opponents outspent the OCA six to one.
On September 10, 1992, the grunge-rock band Nirvana played a benefit concert titled, "No on #9" in opposition to the measure. It was ultimately defeated with 44 percent of the vote.

Legacy 
Although the measure failed, its legacy can still be seen today.
The OCA would go on to back the 1994 Oregon Ballot Measure 13, which would have prevented schools from using materials that were deemed to "legitimize homosexuality", and the 1994 Oregon Ballot Measure 19. They also backed another measure numbered 9 ("son of 9") in 2000. All these were unsuccessful.
Another response of the OCA was to place laws similar to Measure 9 on local ballots in the parts of Oregon where a majority of voters had supported Measure 9. They succeeded in this effort in Josephine, Douglas, Linn, and Klamath counties, as well as in Canby and Junction City. The state legislature eventually overruled these local measures.
Opposition to Ballot Measure 9 formed the basis of much of the current gay rights movement in Oregon, including the organization Basic Rights Oregon.

Full text 
Be it Enacted by the People by the State of Oregon:

PARAGRAPH 1. The Constitution of the State of Oregon is amended by creating a new section to be added to and made a part of Article I and to read:

SECTION
 This state shall not recognize any categorical provision such as "sexual orientation," "sexual preference," and similar phrases that include homosexuality, pedophilia, sadism or masochism. Quotas, minority status, affirmative action, or any similar concepts, shall not apply to these forms of conduct, nor shall government promote these behaviors.
 State, regional and local governments and their properties and monies shall not be used to promote, encourage, or facilitate homosexuality, pedophilia, sadism or masochism.
 State, regional and local governments and their departments, agencies and other entities, including specifically the State Department of Higher Education and the public schools, shall assist in setting a standard for Oregon's youth that recognizes homosexuality, pedophilia, sadism and masochism as abnormal, wrong, unnatural, and perverse and that these behaviors are to be discouraged and avoided.
 It shall be considered that it is the intent of the people in enacting this section that if any part thereof is held unconstitutional, the remaining parts shall be held in force.

See also 
 
 
 
 
 List of Oregon ballot measures

References

Further reading

 
 
 

LGBT law in the United States
1992 Oregon ballot measures
1992 in LGBT history
LGBT in Oregon
Initiatives in the United States